Jean-Daniel Dave Lewis Akpa Akpro (born 11 October 1992) is a professional footballer who plays for  club Empoli, on loan from Lazio. Born in France, he represents the Ivory Coast national team.

Club career
Akpa Akpro made his Ligue 1 debut with Toulouse FC during the 2011–12 season.

On 18 April 2014, Akpa Akpro signed a new three-year deal with the le Téfécé side, keeping him contracted until June 2017.

Salernitana 
On 14 February 2018, he was signed by Italian team Salernitana on a six-month contract.

Lazio 
On 1 September 2020, Akpa Akpro joined Lazio on a two-year deal. He scored his first goal for the club on 20 October 2020, in a 3–1 Champions League victory over Borussia Dortmund.  On 1 September 2022, Akpa Akpro was loaned to Empoli.

International career
From 2013, Akpa Akpro began to be called by Ivory Coast for official matches, making his debut in a 3–0 win against Gambia.

He represented the side at the 2014 FIFA World Cup.

Personal life
Akpa Akpro's brothers Jean-Jacques and Jean-Louis are also both footballers.

Career statistics

Club

International

References

External links
 
 

1992 births
Living people
Footballers from Toulouse
Citizens of Ivory Coast through descent
Ivorian footballers
Ivory Coast international footballers
French footballers
French sportspeople of Ivorian descent
Association football midfielders
Toulouse FC players
U.S. Salernitana 1919 players
S.S. Lazio players
Empoli F.C. players
Ligue 1 players
Serie A players
Serie B players
Africa Cup of Nations-winning players
2014 FIFA World Cup players
2015 Africa Cup of Nations players
2021 Africa Cup of Nations players
French expatriate footballers
Ivorian expatriate footballers
Expatriate footballers in Italy
French expatriate sportspeople in Italy
Ivorian expatriate sportspeople in Italy
Black French sportspeople